Hard Candy may refer to:

 Hard candy, a type of candy made to dissolve slowly in the mouth
 Hard Candy (cosmetics), an American cosmetics company

Music
 Hard Candy (Counting Crows album) or the title song, 2002
 Hard Candy (Madonna album), 2008
 Hard Candy (Ned Doheny album), 1976
 "Hard Candy", a song by Blue October from Sway, 2013

Other media
 Hard Candy (film), a 2005 film directed by David Slade
 Hard Candy: A Book of Stories, a 1954 collection by Tennessee Williams
 Hard Candy, a 1989 novel in the Burke series by Andrew Vachss

See also
 Candies (disambiguation)
 Candy (disambiguation)
 Rock candy, also known as sugar candy (in British English), or rock sugar